Cesare dell' Acqua (22 July 1821 – 16 February 1905) was an Italian painter known for historical works.

Life and career
Cesare Felice Giorgio Dell'Acqua was born in Piran (or Pirano d'Istria), near Trieste, the son of Andrea and Caterina Lengo. He first studied in Koper, but by 1833 he had relocated to Trieste. From 1842 until 1847 he attended the Venice Academy of Fine Arts where he studied with Ludovico Lipparini, Odorico Politi and Michelangelo Grigoletti. One of his early historical paintings, The Meeting of Cimabue and the Young Giotto (1847), was acquired by the Archduke Johann of Austria. After this, he began to receive commissions from noble families, including that of Prince von Lichtenstein.

Following his studies, he traveled through Europe with his patron, Baron Ludovico Luigi Reszan, visiting Vienna, Munich and Paris. In 1855 he married Carolina van der Elst and the couple had two daughters: Eva and Alina. His daughter Eva Dell'Acqua went on to become a noted singer and composer.

In around 1848, he moved to Brussels where his brother Eugenio lived and where he continued his studies with Louis Gallait, who became a major influence on his work. He began to specialize in works representing historical events. Between 1852 and  1877 he completed a number of commissioned works in Trieste that established his reputation as a painter. In Brussels, he exhibited with strong responses and received commissions from prominent families in Brussels, such as Errera, van Wambecke and van der Elst. He also painted two works for the Greek Orthodox Church of Trieste; The Sermon of John in the Dessert which was so highly acclaimed that he was awarded town citizenship in 1851.

In 1873 Dell'Acqua participated at Universal Exhibition in Vienna and also exhibited in London the following year. This resulted in international commissions for his work. At the end of his career, he settled in Brussels, where he completed numerous paintings for use as book illustrations. In addition to historical themes, Dell' Acqua also painted many female subjects dressed in traditional Greek and oriental costume.

Dell'Acqua died in Ixelles on 16 February 1905.

Work
His paintings are included in a number of public collections, including: the Museums of Brussels, Antwerp, Trieste and Bruges. While he is primarily noted for his historical works, he also painted Orientalist subjects.

Select list of paintings
 The Meeting of Cimabue and the Young Giotto,  1847
 Jesus Calling the Small Children to Him, c. 1851
 The Sermon of John in the Dessert, 1851
 Greek Mother 1860
 Arrival of Empress Elisabeth in Miramare, 1865
 Ferdinand Maximilian of Austria is appointed Emperor of Mexico, 1867

Gallery

See also

 List of Orientalist artists
 Orientalism

References

1821 births
1905 deaths
19th-century Italian painters
Accademia di Belle Arti di Venezia alumni
Orientalist painters
People from Piran
Painters from Venice
Italian male painters
19th-century Italian male artists